German Karate Federation (German: Deutsche Karate Verband e. V. (DKV), it is the largest trade association for karate in Germany.

International competition

German Karate Federation is a member of the European umbrella organization European Karate Federation as well as the World Association for World Karate Federation (WKF).

On the part of the German  Olympic Committee, the German Karate Federation is the only Karate Association authorized to send athletes to the Olympic Games.

References

Karate in Germany
Karate organizations
Karate